Grevillea bemboka is a species of flowering plant in the family Proteaceae and is endemic to a restricted area of far south-eastern New South Wales. It is a spreading to erect shrub with hairy branchlets, egg-shaped to elliptic leaves and red or reddish-pink flowers.

Description

Taxonomy
Grevillea bemboka was first formally described in 2005 by Val Stajsic and Bill Molyneux in the journal Muelleria from specimens collected in the Bemboka State Forest in 1992. The specific epithet (bemboka) is a reference to the Bemboka section of the South East Forests National Park and is itself a corruption of the Aboriginal name bumbooke, meaning "moon rising in the sky".

Distribution and habitat
This grevillea is only known from four to six sites in the Bemboka section of the South East Forests National Park, where it grows in forest.

References

bemboka
Flora of New South Wales
Proteales of Australia
Plants described in 2005